Carlos Luis Carrasco (born March 21, 1987), nicknamed "Cookie", is a Venezuelan-American professional baseball pitcher for the New York Mets of Major League Baseball (MLB). He made his MLB debut with the Cleveland Indians in 2009.

Early life
Carrasco was born in 1987 in Barquisimeto, Venezuela.  By age 10 he was playing baseball, initially as a third baseman. He was discovered by a baseball scout in Venezuela at age 16, and threw for Sal Agostinelli, international scouting director for the Philadelphia Phillies, demonstrating a  fastball. At a young age, Carrasco learned to throw left-handed, in addition to his natural right-handed delivery, but he does not consider himself ambidextrous.

Career

Philadelphia Phillies
Carrasco was signed by the Phillies as an undrafted free agent on November 25, 2003. In 2006, Carrasco spent the entire season at the Single-A level with the Lakewood BlueClaws, compiling a 2.26 ERA in  innings pitched. He split time in 2007 between the Single-A Clearwater Threshers and the Double-A Reading Phillies. Carrasco compiled a 2.84 ERA in  innings pitched at Clearwater and a 4.86 ERA in  innings pitched with Reading. Carrasco threw his first no-hitter on August 21, 2007. He was on the World roster of the 2006, 2007, and 2008 All-Star Futures Games.

Entering the 2007 season, Carrasco was ranked as the top prospect in the Phillies organization and the 41st-best prospect in baseball. He was still ranked as the top prospect in the Phillies system entering 2008, and was listed as having the organization's best fastball and changeup.

Cleveland Indians
On July 29, 2009, the Phillies traded Carrasco, along with Jason Donald, Lou Marson, and Jason Knapp to the Cleveland Indians for Cliff Lee and Ben Francisco. Carrasco made his major league debut on September 1. In five starts with the Indians, he had a 0–4 record with 8.87 ERA. During the 2010 season, Carrasco had a 2–2 record and 3.83 ERA in seven starts for Cleveland.

On July 29, 2011, against the Kansas City Royals, Carrasco surrendered a season-high 7 runs over  innings highlighted by a grand slam by outfielder Melky Cabrera. Carrasco took out his frustration by throwing a pitch at the head of Kansas City Royals' designated hitter Billy Butler.  This resulted in his immediate ejection by home plate umpire Scott Barry. Because of this action, MLB suspended Carrasco for 6 games and levied an undisclosed fine.  According to Carrasco, the pitch was not intentional, but he was upset because Cabrera had admired his homer.  Carrasco made 21 starts for Cleveland, pitching to an 8–9 record with 4.62 ERA and striking out 86 batters in  innings. In September 2011, Carrasco underwent Tommy John surgery and eventually missed the entire 2012 season as a result.

On April 9, 2013, Carrasco made his first start since his Tommy John surgery and suspension. His season began with a rather poor outing against the New York Yankees during which he surrendered seven runs in  innings. After giving up a 2-run homer to Robinson Cano, on the next pitch Carrasco hit batter Kevin Youkilis. This resulted in Carrasco's ejection by home plate umpire Jordan Baker. Major League Baseball eventually suspended Carrasco eight games and fined him $5,000 for "intentionally throwing" at Youkilis. This punishment appeared to take into account Carrasco's history and past actions. After the game, Indians manager Terry Francona said that Carrasco's actions "didn't look good." On April 10, 2013, Carrasco was optioned to the Triple-A Columbus Clippers.  Carrasco was recalled to the majors on June 8, and then sent back down to Triple-A on June 24. He was recalled on July 6, and then designated for assignment on July 7. He was then optioned to Columbus on July 9. Carrasco's record for the 2013 season with Cleveland was 1–4 with a 6.75 ERA.

For the 2014 season, Carrasco appeared in 40 games for Cleveland (14 starts) and had an 8–7 record with 2.55 ERA while striking out 140 batters in 134 innings.

On April 7, 2015, Carrasco signed a 4-year extension worth $22 million that also includes club options for 2019 and 2020.
During a game against the Chicago White Sox on April 14, Carrasco was struck in the face by a line drive off the bat of Melky Cabrera. He left the game as he was carted off on a motor stretcher. Carrasco had a bruise on his jaw while X-rays were negative. On July 1, Carrasco took a no-hitter into the ninth inning against the Tampa Bay Rays, only to surrender a two-out, two-strike single to Joey Butler before retiring the side. It would have been the first no-hitter by an Indians pitcher since Len Barker's perfect game on May 15, 1981. On July 19, Carrasco hit the first single of his major league career against the Cincinnati Reds' Johnny Cueto in the top of the second inning. Carrasco went six innings giving up four hits and one earned run with a no decision. In 30 starts during the 2015 season, Carrasco compiled a 14–12 record with a 3.63 ERA, and struck out 216 batters in  innings.

Carrasco made two trips to the disabled list in 2016, the second of which resulted from a line drive to his right hand on September 17 that fractured the fifth metacarpal bone. This injury forced Carrasco to miss the entire postseason. Carrasco finished the 2016 season with an 11–8 record and 3.32 ERA in 25 starts, recording 150 strikeouts in  innings.

In the fifth inning of a July 7, 2017, game against the Detroit Tigers, Carrasco pitched an immaculate inning, striking out the side on the minimum nine pitches. He became only the second pitcher in Indians history to do so, following Justin Masterson in 2014, and the 84th in Major League history. Carrasco struck out 14 Minnesota Twins batters on September 28, in a 5–2 game to give Cleveland their 100th win of the season. For the 2017 season, Carrasco was 18–6 with a 3.29 ERA, striking out 226 in 200 innings.

During 2018, Carrasco struck out 231 batters in 192 innings, pitching to a record of 17–10 with a 3.38 ERA. On December 6, 2018, Carrasco signed a contract extension through the 2022 season with a club option for the 2023 season.

On June 5, 2019, Carrasco was placed on the 10-day injured list, with the team stating that he had been "diagnosed with a blood condition." He subsequently spent the remainder of June on the injured list. On July 6, 2019, Carrasco revealed that he had been diagnosed with chronic myelogenous leukemia, a treatable form of leukemia.
On August 28, 2019, Carrasco was activated from the IL. On September 1, he made his first appearance since his diagnosis, pitching an inning in relief against the Tampa Bay Rays. Carrasco was named the 2019 AL Comeback Player of the Year.

With the 2020 Cleveland Indians, Carrasco appeared in 12 games, compiling a 3–4 record with 2.91 ERA and 82 strikeouts in 68 innings pitched.

New York Mets
On January 7, 2021, the Indians traded Carrasco and Francisco Lindor to the New York Mets for Amed Rosario, Andrés Giménez, Josh Wolf, and Isaiah Greene. During spring training, Carrasco tore his hamstring during a running drill and was expected be out for six to eight weeks. As of late April, he was expected to join the Mets rotation in the second week of May. On May 6, Carrasco was placed on the 60-day injured list as he continued to recover from the injury.

He was activated by the Mets in late July, and made his first appearance with the team on July 30, receiving a no decision in a start against the Cincinnati Reds. The first pitch Carrasco threw for the Mets was hit for a home run by Jonathan India. Carrasco's first season with the Mets was described as "discouraging" and "frustrating." He finished the year with a 6.04 ERA in 12 starts.

After the season, Carrasco revealed that he had been pitching with a bone fragment in his elbow which was repaired with surgery in October.
Carrasco began the 2022 season with a 4 - 1 record in his first eight appearances for the Mets.

On July 30, 2022, he earned his 100th career win after a 4–0 shutout against the Miami Marlins.

Personal life
Carrasco shared in a Players' Tribune article some rather unusual experiences during his early time in the United States.  In his first spring training, he ate Domino's Pizza every day for 90 consecutive days, because "it was the only thing I knew how to order."  Domino's awarded him one month of free pizza for being their "best customer."   He added, he did little outside of baseball in his first few years in the U.S., including not speaking with his teammates.  "Not because I didn’t want to, but because I didn’t know how."  After being traded to the Indians, he dedicated his efforts to learning English.  In August 2016, he became a US citizen.

Carrasco has five children with his wife, Karelis. In 2010, Carrasco and his daughter Camila, then four years old, visited children at a hospital, which inspired Camila to start to cut her hair with scissors to give to the cancer patients.

Carrasco is heavily involved in community development and charity work; he has donated hundreds of thousands of dollars, time, and supplies to organizations located in his native Venezuela along with Colombia, the United States, Africa, and more. He was the 2019 recipient of the Roberto Clemente Award, given annually to an MLB player who "best exemplifies the game of baseball, sportsmanship, community involvement and the individual's contribution to his team."

See also
 List of Major League Baseball pitchers who have thrown an immaculate inning
 List of Major League Baseball players from Venezuela

References

External links

 

1987 births
Living people
Akron Aeros players
American League wins champions
Batavia Muckdogs players
Clearwater Threshers players
Cleveland Indians players
Columbus Clippers players
Florida Complex League Phillies players
Lakewood BlueClaws players
Lehigh Valley IronPigs players
Leones del Caracas players
Major League Baseball pitchers
Major League Baseball players from Venezuela
Venezuelan expatriate baseball players in the United States
Naturalized citizens of the United States
New York Mets players
Reading Phillies players
Syracuse Mets players
Sportspeople from Barquisimeto
Venezuelan emigrants to the United States